The 2018 Ohio Valley Conference men's basketball tournament was the postseason men's basketball tournament that completed the 2017–18 season in the Ohio Valley Conference. The tournament was held February 28 through March 3, 2018 at Ford Center in Evansville, Indiana. 

Regular-season champion Murray State defeated Belmont in the championship game to win the tournament and received conference's automatic bid to the NCAA tournament.

Seeds
Only the top eight teams in the conference qualified for the Tournament. Teams were seeded by record within the division and conference, with a tiebreaker system to seed teams with identical conference The No. 1 and No. 2 seeds received double byes to the semifinals under the merit-based format. The No. 3 and No. 4 seeds received a single bye to the quarterfinals.  records.

Southeast Missouri State, despite finishing in seventh place, was ineligible for the tournament due to Academic Progress Rate violations.

Schedule

Bracket

Source

See also
2018 Ohio Valley Conference women's basketball tournament

References

Ohio Valley Conference men's basketball tournament
Basketball competitions in Evansville, Indiana
Tournament
Ohio Valley Conference men's basketball tournament
Ohio Valley Conference men's basketball tournament
Ohio Valley Conference men's basketball tournament
College basketball tournaments in Indiana